The 1998 Victory Bowl, the second edition of the annual game, was a college football bowl game played on Saturday, November 28, 1998, at Fawcett Stadium in Canton, Ohio. The Tornadoes won 27–6.

Victory Bowl
Victory Bowl
Victory Bowl
Geneva Golden Tornadoes football bowl games
Maranatha Baptist Crusaders football bowl games
Sports in Canton, Ohio
Victory Bowl
Victory Bowl